Tazeh Kand Gandomabad (also Romanized as Tāzeh Kand Gandomābād; also known as Taza-Kend and Tāzeh Kand) is a village in Shal Rural District, Shahrud District, Khalkhal County, Ardabil Province, Iran. At the 2006 census, its population was 52, in 11 families.

References 

Towns and villages in Khalkhal County